Nationality words link to articles with information on the nation's poetry or literature (for instance, Irish or France).

Events

Works published

France
 Joachim du Bellay, France:
 L'Olive, the first sonnet sequence written in France
 La Defense et illustration de la langue françoyse; the author argues that all languages have equal value, and that modern French can express wisdom and truth as well as Ancient Greek, Latin, Italian or Spanish, but du Bellay also advocates adoption of Italianate and classical poetic forms to improve French poetry; he states that it is "no vicious thing, but praiseworthy, to borrow from a foreign tongue thoughts and words and appropriate them to our own"
 Recueil de poesie, presente à tres illustre princesse Madame Marguerite, seur unique du Roy [...]
 Vers lyriques
 Pontus de Tyard. Erreurs amoureuses

Great Britain
 William Baldwin, 
 Robert Crowley, 
 Thomas Sternhold and John Hopkins, translated from the Old Testament

Other
 Friedrich Dedekind, Grobianus a poem written by a German in Latin elegiac verse; enormously popular across Continental Europe (see also Grobiana, an enlarged edition 1554, and Grobianus et Grobiana: sive, de morum simplicitate, libri tres 1558)

Births
Death years link to the corresponding "[year] in poetry" article:
 Giles Fletcher the Elder, birth year uncertain (died 1611), English poet and ambassador; father of Giles Fletcher the younger

Deaths
Birth years link to the corresponding "[year] in poetry" article:
 December 12 – Marguerite de Navarre, also known as "Marguerite of Angoulême" and "Margaret of Navarre" (born 1492), French queen consort of King Henry II of Navarre; patron of humanists and reformers, author, playwright and poet
 date not known – Arakida Moritake 荒木田守武 (born 1473), Japanese, the son of Negi Morihide, and a Shinto priest; said to have excelled in waka, renga, and in particular haikai
 date not known – Arthur Kelton died either 1549 or 1550 (born unknown), author who wrote in rhyme about Welsh history

See also

 Poetry
 16th century in poetry
 16th century in literature
 French Renaissance literature
 Renaissance literature
 Spanish Renaissance literature

Notes

16th-century poetry
Poetry